La République En Marche group may refer to:

 La République En Marche group (National Assembly), the French National Assembly parliamentary group
 La République En Marche group (Senate), the French Senate parliamentary group